A Bullet in the Heart (translit.Rosasa Fil Qalb) is a 1964 Egyptian comedy play written by Tawfiq El-Hakim and directed by Kamal Hussein. It is based on Tawfiq El-Hakim's play with the same name. It stars Salah Zulfikar. This play is one of three plays of El-Hakim, in which the conclusion was open and unconvincing in that way, and it was Salah Zulfikar's theatrical debut.

Synopsis 
The events revolve around Naguib, who has a dire financial situation, who falls in love with the girl Fifi at first sight and does not know who she is, so he tells his friend, Dr. Sami, the story and she's originally his friend's fiancé.

Primary cast 

 Salah Zulfikar as Naguib
 Laila Taher as Fifi
 Waheed Ezzat as Dr. Sami
 Abdul Mohsen Saleem
 Ahmed Hussein
 Badruddin Hassanein

References

External links 

 A Bullet in the Heart on elCinema

Egyptian plays
1964 plays
Arabic-language plays